The Airbus A330 is a wide-body aircraft developed and produced by Airbus.

Airbus conceived several derivatives of the A300, its first airliner from the mid-1970s. Then the company began development on the A330 twinjet in parallel with the A340 quadjet and launched both designs with their first orders in June 1987.
The A330-300, the first variant, took its maiden flight in November 1992 and entered service with Air Inter in January 1994. The slightly shorter A330-200 variant followed in 1998.

The A330 shares its airframe with the early A340 variants, but having two main landing gear legs instead of three, lower weights, and slightly different lengths. Both airliners have fly-by-wire controls as well as a similar glass cockpit to increase the commonality. The A330 was Airbus's first airliner to offer a choice of three engines: the General Electric CF6, Pratt & Whitney PW4000, or the Rolls-Royce Trent 700. The A330-300 has a range of 11,750 km or 6,350 nmi with 277 passengers, while the shorter A330-200 can cover 13,450 km or 7,250 nmi with 247 passengers. Other variants include the A330-200F dedicated freighter, the A330 MRTT military tanker, and the ACJ330 corporate jet. The A330 MRTT was proposed as the EADS/Northrop Grumman KC-45 for the US Air Force's KC-X competition, but lost to the Boeing KC-46 in appeal after an initial win.

In July 2014, Airbus announced the re-engined A330neo (new engine option) comprising A330-800/900, which entered service with TAP Air Portugal in December 2018. With the exclusive, more efficient Trent 7000 turbofan and improvements including sharklets, it offers up to 14% better fuel economy per seat. Earlier A330s (-200/200F/300) are now called A330ceo (current engine option).

Delta Air Lines is currently the largest operator with 62 airplanes in its fleet. , A330 orders stood at 1,774 of which 1,559 had been delivered and 1,467 were in service with 142 operators. The global A330 fleet had accumulated more than 60 million flight hours since its entry into service. The A330 is the third most delivered wide-body airliner after the Boeing 777 and Boeing 747. It competes with the Boeing 767, smaller variants of the Boeing 777, and the 787. It is complemented by the larger Airbus A350, which succeeded the four-engined A340.

Development

Background

Airbus's first airliner, the A300, was envisioned as part of a diverse family of commercial aircraft. Pursuing this goal, studies began in the early 1970s into derivatives of the A300. Before introducing the A300, Airbus identified nine possible variations designated B1 through B9. A tenth variant, the A300B10, was conceived in 1973 and developed into the longer-range Airbus A310. Airbus then focused its efforts on single-aisle (SA) studies, conceiving a family of airliners later known as the Airbus A320 family, the first commercial aircraft with digital fly-by-wire controls. During these studies Airbus turned its focus back to the wide-body aircraft market, simultaneously working on both projects.

In the mid-1970s, Airbus began development of the A300B9, a larger derivative of the A300, which would eventually become the A330. The B9 was essentially a lengthened A300 with the same wing, coupled with the most powerful turbofan engines available. It was targeted at the growing demand for high-capacity, medium-range, transcontinental trunk routes. Offering the same range and payload as the McDonnell Douglas DC-10 but with 25 per cent better fuel efficiency, the B9 was seen as a viable replacement for the DC-10 and the Lockheed L-1011 TriStar trijets. It was also considered as a medium-ranged successor to the A300.

At the same time, a 200-seat four-engine version, the B11 (which would eventually become the A340) was also under development. The B11 was originally planned to take the place of narrow-body Boeing 707s and Douglas DC-8s then in commercial use, but would later evolve to target the long-range, wide-body trijet replacement market. To differentiate from the SA series, the B9 and B11 were re-designated as the TA9 and TA11, with TA standing for "twin aisle". Development costs were reduced by the two aircraft using the same fuselage and wing, with projected savings of US$500 million. Another factor was the split preference of those within Airbus and, more importantly, those of prospective customers; twinjets were favoured in North America, quad-jets desired in Asia, and operators had mixed views in Europe. Airbus ultimately found that most potential customers favoured four engines for their exemption from existing twinjet range restrictions and their ability to be ferried with one inactive engine. As a result, development plans prioritised the four-engined TA11 ahead of the TA9.

Design effort

The first specifications for the TA9 and TA11, aircraft that could accommodate 410 passengers in a one-class layout, emerged in 1982. They showed a large underfloor cargo area that could hold five cargo pallets or sixteen LD3 cargo containers in the forward, and four pallets or fourteen LD3s in the aft hold—double the capacity of the Lockheed L-1011 TriStar or DC-10, and  longer than the Airbus A300. By June 1985, the TA9 and TA11 had received more improvements, including the adoption of the A320 flight deck, digital fly-by-wire (FBW) control system, and side-stick control. Airbus had developed a common cockpit for their aircraft models to allow quick transition by pilots. The flight crews could transition from one type to another after only one week's training, which reduces operator costs. The two TAs would use the vertical stabiliser, rudder, and circular fuselage sections of the A300-600, extended by two barrel sections.

Airbus briefly considered the variable camber wing, a concept that requires changing the wing profile for a given phase of flight. Studies were carried out by British Aerospace (BAe), now part of BAE Systems, at Hatfield and Bristol. Airbus estimated this would yield a two per cent improvement in aerodynamic efficiency, but the feature was rejected because of cost and difficulty of development. A true laminar flow wing (a low-drag shape that improves fuel efficiency) was also considered but rejected.

With necessary funding available, the Airbus Supervisory Board approved the development of the A330 and A340 with potential customers on 27 January 1986. Its chairman Franz Josef Strauss stated afterwards that "Airbus Industrie is now in a position to finalise the detailed technical definition of the TA9, now officially designated as the A330, and the TA11, now called the A340, with potential launch customer airlines, and to discuss with them the terms and conditions for launch commitments". The designations were originally reversed and were switched so the quad-jet airliner would have a "4" in its name. Airbus hoped for five airlines to sign for both the A330 and A340, and on 12 May sent sale proposals to the most likely candidates, including Lufthansa and Swissair.

Engines
From the beginning of the TA9's development, a choice of engines from the three major engine manufacturers, Rolls-Royce, Pratt & Whitney, and GE Aviation, was planned. GE Aviation first offered the CF6-80C2.

Rolls-Royce initially wanted to use the  Trent 600 to power Airbus's newest twinjet and the upcoming McDonnell Douglas MD-11. The A330 became the first Airbus aircraft for which Rolls-Royce supplied engines.

Similarly, Pratt & Whitney signed an agreement that covered the development of the A330-exclusive PW4168. Like the CF6-80E1, 34 blades were used instead of the 38 found on the smaller PW4000 engines.

Production and testing

In preparation for the production of the A330 and the A340, Airbus's partners invested heavily in new facilities. In north Wales, BAe also spent £5 million on a new production line at its Broughton wing production plant. In Germany, Messerschmitt-Bölkow-Blohm (MBB) invested DM400 million ($225 million) on manufacturing facilities in the Weser estuary, including at Bremen, Einswarden, Varel, and Hamburg. France saw the biggest investments, with Aérospatiale constructing a new Fr.2.5 billion ($411 million) final-assembly plant adjacent to Toulouse-Blagnac Airport in Colomiers; by November 1988, the pillars for the new Clément Ader assembly hall had been erected. The assembly process featured increased automation, such as robots drilling holes and installing fasteners during the wing-to-fuselage mating process.

On 12 March 1987, Airbus received the first orders for the twinjet. Domestic French airline Air Inter placed five firm orders and fifteen options, while Thai Airways International requested eight aircraft, split evenly between firm orders and options. Airbus announced the next day that it would formally launch the A330 and A340 programmes by April 1987, with deliveries of the A340 to begin in May 1992 and A330 deliveries to start in 1993. Northwest Airlines signed a letter of intent for twenty A340s and ten A330s on 31 March. The program cost was $3.5 billion with the A340, in 2001 dollars.

BAe eventually received £450 million of funding from the UK government, well short of the £750 million it had originally requested for the design and construction of the wings. The German and French governments also provided funding. Airbus issued subcontracts to companies in Australia, Austria, Canada, China, Greece, Italy, India, Japan, South Korea, Portugal, the United States, and the former Yugoslavia. With funding in place, Airbus launched the A330 and A340 programmes on 5 June 1987, just prior to the Paris Air Show. At that time, the order book stood at 130 aircraft from ten customers, including lessor International Lease Finance Corporation (ILFC). Of the order total, forty-one were for A330s. In 1989, Asian carrier Cathay Pacific joined the list of purchasers, ordering nine A330s and later increasing this number to eleven.

The wing-to-fuselage mating of the first A330, the tenth airframe of the A330 and A340 line, began in mid-February 1992. This aircraft, coated with anti-corrosion paint, was rolled out on 31 March without its General Electric CF6-80E1 engines, which were installed by August. During a static test, the wing failed just below requirement; BAe engineers later resolved the problem. At the 1992 Farnborough Airshow, Northwest deferred delivery of sixteen A330s to 1994, following the cancellation of its A340 orders.

The first completed A330 was rolled out on 14 October 1992, with the maiden flight following on 2 November. Weighing , including  of test equipment, the A330 became the largest twinjet to have flown until the first flight of the Boeing 777. The flight lasted five hours and fifteen minutes during which speed, height, and other flight configurations were tested. Airbus intended the test flight programme to comprise six aircraft flying a total of 1,800 hours. On 21 October 1993, the Airbus A330 received the European Joint Aviation Authorities (JAA) and the US Federal Aviation Administration (FAA) certifications simultaneously after 1,114 cumulative airborne test hours and 426 test flights. At the same time, weight tests came in favourable, showing the plane was  under weight.

On 30 June 1994, a fatal crash occurred during certification of the Pratt & Whitney engine when an A330 crashed near Toulouse. Both pilots and the five passengers died. The flight was designed to test autopilot response during a one-engine-off worst-case scenario with the centre of gravity near its aft limit. Shortly after takeoff, the pilots had difficulty setting the autopilot, and the aircraft lost speed and crashed. An investigation by an internal branch of Direction Générale d'Aviation concluded that the accident resulted from slow response and incorrect actions by the crew during the recovery. This led to a revision of A330 operating procedures.

Entry into service

Air Inter became the first operator of the A330, having put the aircraft into service on 17 January 1994 between Orly Airport, Paris, and Marseille. Deliveries to Malaysia Airlines (MAS) and Thai Airways International were postponed to address delamination of the composite materials in the PW4168 engine's thrust reverser assembly. Thai Airways received its first A330 during the second half of the year, operating it on routes from Bangkok to Taipei and Seoul. Cathay Pacific received its Trent 700 A330s following the certification of that engine on 22 December 1994. MAS received its A330 on 1 February 1995 and then rescheduled its other ten orders.

Shrinking the -300: the -200 

In response to a decline in A330-300 sales, increased market penetration by the Boeing 767-300ER, and airline requests for increased range and smaller aircraft, Airbus developed the Airbus A330-200. Known as the A329 and A330M10 during development, the A330-200 would offer nine per cent lower operating costs than the Boeing 767-300ER. The plane was aimed at the  sector, where Airbus predicted demand for 800 aircraft between 1995 and 2015. The project, with US$450 million in expected development costs, was approved by the Airbus Industrie Supervisory Board on 24 November 1995.

The A330-200 first flew on 13 August 1997. The sixteen-month certification process involved logging 630 hours of test flights. The A330-200's first customer was ILFC; these aircraft were leased by Canada 3000, who became the type's first operator.

As Airbus worked on its A330-200, hydraulic pump problems were reported by both A330 and A340 operators. This issue was the suspected cause of a fire that destroyed an Air France A340-200 in January 1994. On 4 January of that year, a Malaysia Airlines A330-300, while undergoing regular maintenance at Singapore Changi Airport, was consumed by a fire that started in the right-hand main undercarriage well. The incident caused US$30 million in damage, and the aircraft took six months to repair. Consequently, operators were advised to disable electrical pumps in January 1997.

Proposed variants
 A330-400/600
In 1996 Airbus evaluated a 12-frame stretch which would be able to carry 380 passengers over almost , the -400, and a "super-stretch" using the A340-600's 22-frame stretch and powered by  engines, the -600.

 A330-100/-500
In February 2000 it was reported that a 250-seat A330-100 replacement for the A300/A310 could be launched by year end for 2003 deliveries. Shortened and keeping its fly-by-wire cockpit and systems, with a cleaner A300-600 wing with sealed control surfaces and winglets and at least two new engine types among the GE CF6-80, the PW4000 and the A340-500/600's Trent 500 aimed for 5% better SFC than the A300-600. Its  wing allowed a  MTOW and  range. In May, the 210-260 seat design had evolved towards keeping the A330  span wing and engines for a 195 t MTOW and  range. Interested customers included Singapore Airlines, Lufthansa and Hapag-Lloyd.

Announced in July at Farnborough Air Show, the -500 first flight was targeted for early 2003 and introduction in early 2004. ILFC would take 10 if it was launched and CIT was interested too. The eight-frame shrink would carry 222 in three classes or 266 in two classes. The market was lukewarm as airlines like Lufthansa, Hapag-Lloyd and Singapore Airlines were unimpressed by the long-range A330-500, favouring a more refined short-range design. Lack of airline demand made lessors interest wane and as ILFC would order as 30 -500s, it would be with converting rights to larger A330-200/300.

 A330-200Lite
To compete with Boeing's 7E7 (later 787), Airbus offered a minimum-change derivative called the A330-200Lite in 2004. It was aimed at Singapore Airlines, who had looked to replace its Airbus A310-300s. The variant was also to be a replacement for Airbus A300-600Rs and early Boeing 767s. Airlines, however, were not satisfied with the compromised aircraft; the company instead proceeded with an entirely new aircraft, the A350 XWB.

Further developments

Initially, the GE90 was only one of three B777 options, and GE Aviation then-CEO Brian H. Rowe would have paid for the development of putting it on an A330; however, Airbus' strategy for long-haul was the four-engine A340, missing the market favouring twins.

Responding to lagging A300-600F and A310F sales, Airbus began marketing the Airbus A330-200F, a freighter derivative of the A330-200, around 2001. The plane utilises the same nosegear as the passenger version; however, it is attached lower in the fuselage and housed in a distinctive bulbous "blister fairing". This raises the aircraft's nose so that the cargo deck is level during loading, as the standard A330's landing gear results the plane having a nose-down attitude while on the ground.

The A330-200F made its maiden flight on 5 November 2009. This marked the start of a four-month, 180-hour certification programme. JAA and FAA certifications were expected by March the following year although approval by the JAA was delayed until April. The first delivery was subsequently made to the Etihad Airways cargo division, Etihad Cargo, in July 2010.

On 25 September 2013 at the Aviation Expo China (Beijing Airshow), Airbus announced a new lower weight A330-300 variant, optimised for use on domestic and regional routes in high growth markets with large populations and concentrated traffic flows; China and India were recognised as prime targets. This variant could carry up to 400 passengers. The increased efficiency, however, comes more from the installation of more seats than any weight reduction. On relatively short, yet congested routes, the A330 competes against single-aisle jetliners. While the A330's operating costs in these conditions are not far above those of the Boeing 737 or Airbus A321, the A320neo and 737 MAX promise more efficiency. Where the frequency of flights cannot be increased, using larger aircraft, such as the A330, is the only available option to increase capacity. The first customer for the A330 Regional was announced as Saudia at the 2015 Paris Air Show. In 2018, the unit cost of an A330-200 was US$238.5M, US$264.2M for an A330-300 and US$241.7M for an A330-200F.

New Engine Option

The A330neo ("neo" for "New Engine Option") is a development from the initial A330 (now A330ceo — "Current Engine Option"). A new version with modern engines developed for the Boeing 787 was called for by owners of the current A330. It was launched in July 2014 at the Farnborough Airshow, promising 14% better fuel economy per seat. It will use the larger Rolls-Royce Trent 7000 exclusively. Its two versions are based on the A330-200 and -300: the -800 should cover  with 257 passengers while the -900 should cover  with 287 passengers. The -900 made its first flight on 19 October 2017, received its EASA type certificate on 26 September 2018, and was first delivered to TAP Air Portugal on 26 November. The -800 made its first flight on 6 November 2018, aiming for a mid-2019 type certification and delivery in the first half of 2020.

Production

Airbus announced in February 2011 that it intended to raise production rates from seven-and-a-half/eight per month to nine per month in 2012, and ten in 2013. Production increased to 10 aircraft per month in April 2013, the highest for any Airbus wide-body aircraft. In 2012, Airbus expected the A330 to continue selling until at least 2020, with the A350-900 expected to replace the A330-300.

On 19 July 2013, Airbus delivered its 1000th A330 to Cathay Pacific. The A330 became the first Airbus wide-body airliner to reach 1,000 deliveries, and the fourth wide-body to achieve the milestone after the Boeing 747, 767, and 777. As of January 2019, a total of 1,496 A330ceos had been ordered, with 1,437 delivered.

In December 2014, Airbus announced that it would reduce A330 production to nine aircraft per month from ten, because of falling orders. Airbus did not rule out any further production cuts. The announcement led to an immediate drop in Airbus Group's stock price because the company derived a significant percentage of its cash flow and net profit from the A330 program; the A330's financial impact was magnified amid problems in the A350 and A380 programs. In February 2015, Airbus announced another production rate cut to six aircraft per month in the first quarter of 2016. This would extend A330ceo production to July 2017, allowing for a smooth transition to A330neo production, which was set to start in spring 2017. In February 2016, Airbus announced it would re-increase the production rate from 6 to 7 per month, in response to new A330 orders.

In April 2018, as a result of weakening demand, Airbus announced further rate cuts to 4-5 aircraft a month (50 per year) in 2019. In 2019, Airbus delivered 53 A330s (including 41 A330neos), including some delayed from 2018, and was set to reach a rate of 40 per year, to reflect softer demand for wide-bodies, as the backlog reached 331 (including 293 A330neos) − or  years' worth of production.

The last A330-200 was delivered to OpenSkies (operating for LEVEL) on October 1, 2019.
The last A330-300 built was flown to Brussels Airport on February 28, 2020; Aer Lingus took delivery on 4 March 2020. At the time, four completed A330-300s for troubled Hong Kong Airlines were still undelivered.
A330 MRTT/KC-30B and BelugaXL production both continue alongside that of the A330neo.

The COVID-19 pandemic reduced demand for new jets in 2020, and Airbus cut its monthly production from 4.5 to 2 A330s.
In September 2020, the A330 reached a milestone of 1500 deliveries, Airbus's first twin-aisle aircraft to do so, and the third overall after the Boeing 747 and 777.

Design

The A330 is a medium-size, wide-body aircraft, with two engines suspended on pylons under the wings. A two-wheel nose undercarriage and two four-wheel bogie main legs built by Messier-Dowty support the aeroplane on the ground. John Leahy states that it was intentionally being held down in takeoff weight and performance because Airbus avoided overlapping with the A340.

The airframe of the A330 features a low-wing lever monoplane with a wing virtually identical to that of the A340-200/300. On the A330-300, one engine is installed at the inboard pylon while the outboard pylon position is not used; for the A340-300, both engine pylons are used, which allows the A340-300 wing to sustain a higher (wing-limited) MTOW. This is as the A340's two engines at each wing provide a more equal force distribution (engine weight) over the wing, while also the total engine weight counteracting moment is located more outboard with more engine weight located further outboard on the wing, hence the wing root bending moment with equal TOW is less on the A340-300 than on the A330-300. The wings were designed and manufactured by BAe, which developed a long slender wing with a very high aspect ratio to provide high aerodynamic efficiency.

The wing is swept back at 30 degrees and, along with other design features, allows a maximum operating Mach number of 0.86. To reach a long span and high aspect ratio without a large weight penalty, the wing has relatively high thickness-to-chord ratio of 11.8% or 12.8%. Jet airliners have Thickness-to-chord ratios ranging from 9.4% (MD-11 or Boeing 747) to 13% (Avro RJ or 737 Classic).

The shared wing design with the A340 allowed the A330 to incorporate aerodynamic features developed for the former aircraft. The failure of International Aero Engines' radical ultra-high-bypass V2500 "SuperFan", which had promised around 15 per cent fuel burn reduction for the A340, led to multiple enhancements including wing upgrades to compensate. At , the wingspan is similar to that of the larger Boeing 747-200, but with 35 percent less wing area.

Typical seating arrangements are 2–2–2 six-abreast in business class and 2–4–2 eight-abreast in economy class. The fin, rudder, elevators, horizontal tail plane are used as fuel tank, flaps, ailerons and spoilers; they are made of composite materials, making 10% of the structure weight. When necessary, the A330 uses the Honeywell 331–350C auxiliary power unit (APU) to provide pneumatics and electrical power.

The A330 shares the same glass cockpit flight deck layout as the A320 and the A340, featuring electronic instrument displays rather than mechanical gauges. Instead of a conventional control yoke, the flight deck features side-stick controls, six main displays, and the Electronic Flight Instrument System (EFIS), which covers navigation and flight displays, as well as the Electronic Centralised Aircraft Monitor (ECAM). Apart from the flight deck, the A330 also has the fly-by-wire system common to the A320 family, the A340, the A350, and the A380. It also features three primary and two secondary flight control systems, as well as a flight envelope limit protection system which prevents maneuvers from exceeding the aircraft's aerodynamic and structural limits.

Operational history
Airbus intended the A330 to compete in the Extended-range Twin-engine Operation Performance Standards (ETOPS) market, specifically with the Boeing 767. (ETOPS is a standard that allows longer range flights away from a diversion airport for aircraft that have met special design and testing standards.) Instead of the "ETOPS out of the box" or "Early ETOPS" approach taken by Boeing with its 777, Airbus gradually increased ETOPS approval on the A330 using in-service experience. Airbus suggested that the A340 and the A330 were essentially identical except for their engine number, and that the A340's experience could be applied to the A330's ETOPS approval. The plans were for all three engine types to enter service with 90-minute approval, before increasing to 120 minutes after the total A330 fleet accumulated 25,000 flight hours, and then to 180 minutes after 50,000 flight hours, in 1995. Aer Lingus and Cathay Pacific were two important airlines assisting Airbus in this endeavour by building up in-service flight hours on over-ocean flights. In November 2009, the A330 became the first aircraft to receive ETOPS–240 approval, which has since been offered by Airbus as an option.

, the global A330 fleet had 11.5 years average aircraft age (≈2 years for A330neo) and accumulated more than 60 million flight hours since its entry into service with 99.5% operational reliability.

Variants
With the launch of Airbus A330neo, the existing members of the Airbus A330 family (A330-200, 200F, 300, and MRTT) received the Airbus A330ceo ("current engine option") name.

A330ceo

A330-300

It received European and American certification on 21 October 1993 after 420 test flights over 1,100 hours. The −300 entered service on 16 January 1994. The A330-300 is based on a stretched A300 fuselage but with new wings, stabilisers and fly-by-wire systems.

In 2010, Airbus offered a new version of the −300 with the maximum gross weight increased by two tonnes to 235 t. This enabled  extension of the range as well as 1.2 t increase in payload. In mid-2012, Airbus proposed another increase of the maximum gross weight to 240 t. It is planned to be implemented by mid-2015. It will include engine and aerodynamic improvements reducing its fuel burn by about 2%. Airbus is also planning to activate the central fuel tank for the first time for the −300 model.

As of December 2020, a total of 779 of the -300 had been ordered, 771 of which had been delivered, with 742 in operation. The 2015 list price is $264 million. The closest competitors have been the Boeing 777-200/200ER, and the now out-of-production McDonnell Douglas MD-11.

A330-300HGW

In 2000, it was reported that Airbus was studying an A330-300 version with a higher gross weight. The version would have a strengthened wing and additional fuel capacity from a  centre section fuel tank. Among those that showed interest was leasing company ILFC, which sought airliners that could fly from the US West Coast to Europe.

Power was to be supplied by all three engines offered to A330-200 and A330-300 with lower gross weight. Airbus also considered using the new Engine Alliance GP7000 engine for the A330-300HGW, which would have been the engine's first twinjet application. The −300HGW was to enter airline service in 2004. However, the -300HGW programme was not launched and quietly disappeared.

The 240-tonne A330 reappeared years later when Airbus announced at the 2012 Farnborough Airshow that it would be an available option for both the A330-300 and the A330-200. In November 2012, the maximum take off weight was further increased to 242 tonnes. The first of these aircraft was delivered to Delta Air Lines on 28 May 2015.

A330 Regional
In September 2013, Airbus announced a version of the A330-300, named A330 Regional or A330-300 Regional. It is said to provide up to 26% lower operating costs than the longer range version A330-300.

On 18 August 2016, Airbus delivered the first A330 Regional to Saudia.

A330-200

The A330-200 is a shortened, longer-range variant, which entered service in 1998 with Korean Air. The −200 is offered with three engine types similar to those found on the −300, namely the General Electric CF6-80E, Pratt & Whitney PW4000, or Rolls-Royce Trent 700.

A new vertical stabiliser was introduced in 2004 beginning with MSN 555.

In 2008, Airbus released plans for a higher gross weight version of the A330-200 to more effectively compete against the Boeing 787 Dreamliner. The new-build A330-200HGW had a 5 tonne increase in Maximum Takeoff Weight, allowing a  range increase and a  payload increase. Korean Air became the first customer on 27 February 2009 with an order for six −200HGWs. Deliveries of the first aircraft started in 2010.

In mid-2012, Airbus proposed another version of the −200 with the maximum gross weight increased by 2 t to 240 t. This version had its range extended by 270 nmi and carried 2.5 t more payload. It saw engine and aerodynamic improvements reducing its fuel burn by about 2%. It was certified by the EASA on 8 September 2015.

As of December 2020, 661 of the −200 had been ordered, 645 of which had been delivered, with 600 aircraft in operation. The 2018 list price is $238.5 million. The −200 competes with the Boeing 767-300ER and to a lesser extent the 767-400ER as well as with the new 787 Dreamliner. In 1998, a newly delivered A330-200 was valued $94 million, rose over $100 million in 2005 but lowered at almost $75 million in 2019 as the market favours the -300 and the A330neo.

A330-200F

To overcome the standard A330's nose-down body angle on the ground, the A330F uses a revised nose undercarriage layout to provide a level deck during cargo loading. The normal A330-200 undercarriage is used, but its attachment points are lower in the fuselage, thus requiring a distinctive blister fairing on the nose to accommodate the retracted nose gear. Power is provided by two Pratt & Whitney PW4000 or Rolls-Royce Trent 700 engines. General Electric does not offer an engine for the A330-200F.

 Airbus had delivered 38 aircraft with no outstanding orders. The list price is $241.7 million. As well as new-build freighters, Airbus has proposed passenger-to-freighter conversions of existing −200 airliners. The A330-200F is sized between the 767-300F and 777F, but trails both Boeing models in orders and deliveries.

A330P2F

The A330P2F freighter conversion programme was launched at the 2012 Singapore Airshow with the support of Airbus, their Dresden-based Elbe Flugzeugwerke (EFW) joint venture and Singapore-based engineering firm ST Aerospace. Targeting a 2016 introduction, Airbus then estimated a market requirement for 2,700 freighters over 20 years, half of these mid-sized, including 900 conversions.

Following flight tests in October 2017 and EASA Supplemental Type Certificate awarded in November, the first was delivered to DHL on 1 December.

Following June Flight tests and the STC in July, the first was delivered to EgyptAir Cargo on 3 August 2018.

The P2F version of the A330 retains the passenger aircraft's geometry and incorporates a powered cargo loading system to enable pallets to be moved "uphill" on the main cargo deck, and therefore does not have the distinctive nose blister, or "bulge", of the factory delivered A330-200F.

On 3 March 2022, Air Transport Services Group (ATSG), an air freighter lessor, committed to acquiring 29 Airbus A330-300 Passenger-to-Freighter (P2F) conversion slots from EFW with deliveries in the 2023 to 2027 timeframe. The aircraft will be converted mainly at EFW's facility in Dresden, Germany, and at a new conversion site in Shanghai, China.

A330neo

A330-800
The Airbus A330-800 is based on the A330-200, with, cabin modifications, larger Trent 7000 engines and aerodynamic improvements. The A330-800s maiden flight took place on 6 November 2018. The first two A330-800's were delivered to their launch customer Kuwait Airways in October 2020.

A330-900
The Airbus A330-900 maintains the A330-300's fuselage dimensions with 10 more seats thanks to cabin optimisation. With modern Trent 7000 engines and redesigned winglets, it should burn 14% less fuel per seat than the A330-300 over a distance of 4,000 nmi. It should travel  with 287 passengers in a standard configuration.

BelugaXL (large cargo freighter)

Airbus started design of a replacement aircraft for the Beluga in November 2014. The BelugaXL A330-743L is based on the Airbus A330, and has 30% more space than its predecessor. Like the Beluga, the BelugaXL features an extension on its fuselage top, but can accommodate two A350 wings instead of one. The new aircraft rolled out of the assembly line on 4 January 2018, making its maiden flight on 19 July 2018. It began ferrying cargo between different Airbus factories in January 2020.

Corporate jet variants

ACJ330
The A330-200 is available as an ultra-long-range Airbus Corporate Jet known as the A330-200 Prestige, with a range of 15,400 km (8,300 nmi) and a capacity of 50 passengers.

ACJ330neo
A corporate jet version of the new A330neo capable of flying 25 passengers 19,260km (10,400nm) or 21 hours, enough to fly non-stop from Europe to Australia.

Military variants

Airbus A330 MRTT

The Airbus A330 MRTT is the Multi-Role Transport and Tanker (MRTT) version of the A330-200, designed for aerial refuelling and strategic transport. , approximately 60 orders had been placed for the A330 MRTT by air forces of thirteen countries.

EADS/Northrop Grumman KC-45
The EADS/Northrop Grumman KC-45 was a proposed version of the A330 MRTT for the United States Air Force (USAF)'s KC-X aerial refuelling programme. In February 2008, the USAF selected the aircraft to replace the Boeing KC-135 Stratotanker. The replacement process was mired in controversy, instances of corruption, and allegations of favouritism. In July 2010, EADS submitted a tanker bid to the USAF without Northrop Grumman as a partner. However, on 24 February 2011, the USAF picked the Boeing KC-767 proposal, later named KC-46, as the winner because of its lower cost.

Operators

By 2012, the 830 A330s in service with over 90 operators had accumulated five million revenue flights and 20 million flight hours, with a dispatch reliability above 99%. In November 2017, 1,190 were transporting passengers with 106 airlines (the top 29 operated two-thirds of the fleet), consisting of 530 -200s and 660 A330-300s, mainly high-gross-weight, with 36 original shorter-range A330-300s, half of them built since January 2010.
Of operators of at least five A330s, 17 have ordered A350-900s, 11 have ordered B787-8/9s, 13 both, 3 have ordered A330neos and 2 both A330neos and A350s; 14 haven't yet decided on a replacement. By August 2019, the A330 was operated between over 400 airports in the world, by more than 120 operators, while its average dispatch reliability was over 99% and annual utilization up to 6,000 flight hours. The 1,500th airplane, an A330-900 (A330neo), was delivered to Delta Air Lines on 21 September 2020.

 
, A330 family aircraft orders stood at 1,774, of which 1,559 had been delivered and 1,467, comprising 596 A330-200s, 38 -200Fs, 741 -300s, 7 -800s and 85 -900s, were in airline service with 142 operators. The five largest operators were Delta Air Lines (62), Turkish Airlines (61), China Eastern Airlines (55), Air China (53), China Southern Airlines (40).

Orders and deliveries

'''Data

Accidents and incidents

, the Airbus A330 has been involved in 45 Aviation accidents and incidents, including 14 hull-losses (10 due to flight related accidents and 4 due to criminal related accidents), for a total of 339 fatalities.

Accidents 
The A330's first fatal accident occurred on 30 June 1994 near Toulouse on a test flight when an Airbus-owned A330-300 crashed while simulating an engine failure on climbout, killing all seven on board. Airbus subsequently advised A330 operators to disconnect the autopilot and limit pitch attitude in the event of an engine failure at low speed.

Malfunctioning pitot tubes provided an early focus for the investigation, as the aircraft involved had Thales-built "–AA" models known to indicate faulty airspeed data during icing conditions. In July 2009, Airbus advised A330 and A340 operators to replace Thales pitots with equivalents manufactured by Goodrich. Investigators later determined that the inadequate response of the pilots to both a loss of airspeed data from malfunctioning pitot tubes and subsequent autopilot disengagement followed by incorrect reaction by pilot flying resulted in Flight 447 entering into an aerodynamic stall.

On 12 May 2010, Afriqiyah Airways Flight 771, an A330-200, crashed on approach to Tripoli International Airport, Libya, on a flight from O. R. Tambo International Airport, Johannesburg, South Africa. Of the 104 people on board, all but one nine-year-old Dutch child died. The cause of the crash was determined to be pilot error.

On 23 October 2022, Korean Air Flight 631, an Airbus A330-300 registration HL7525, operating from Seoul to Cebu, crash landed and overshot the runway while landing in poor weather at night.

Incidents 
 Flight data related
In 2008, Air Caraïbes reported two incidents of pitot tube icing malfunctions on its A330s.

On 7 October 2008, Qantas Flight 72, an A330-300, suffered a rapid loss of altitude in two sudden uncommanded pitch-down manoeuvres while  from the RAAF Learmonth air base in northwestern Australia. After declaring an emergency, the crew landed the aircraft safely at Learmonth. It was later determined that the incident, which caused 106 injuries, 14 of them serious, was the result of a design flaw of the plane's Air Data Inertial Reference Unit and a limitation of the aircraft's flight computer software.

 Fuel system related
On 24 August 2001, Air Transat Flight 236, an A330-200, developed a fuel leak over the Atlantic Ocean due to an incorrectly installed hydraulic part and was forced to glide for over 15 minutes to an emergency landing in the Azores.

On 13 April 2010, Cathay Pacific Flight 780 from Surabaya Juanda International Airport to Hong Kong landed safely after contaminated fuel caused both engines to fail. Fifty-seven passengers were injured. Its two pilots received the Polaris Award from the International Federation of Air Line Pilots' Associations for their heroism and airmanship.

 Chemical and fire related
On 15 March 2000, a Malaysia Airlines A330-300 suffered structural damage due to leaking oxalyl chloride, a corrosive chemical substance that had been improperly labeled before shipping. The aircraft was written off.

On 27 August 2019, an Air China A330-300 at Beijing Capital International Airport caught fire while at the gate. The passengers and crew were safely evacuated. The airplane was likely damaged beyond repair.

 Hijackings and war related
The two hijackings involving the A330 have resulted in one fatality, namely the hijacker of Philippine Airlines Flight 812 on 25 May 2000, who jumped out of the aircraft to his death. The hijacking of Sabena Flight 689 on 13 October 2000 ended with no casualties when Spanish police took control of the aircraft. On 24 July 2001, two unoccupied SriLankan Airlines A330s were destroyed amid an attack on Bandaranaike International Airport, in Colombo, Sri Lanka, by the Liberation Tigers of Tamil Eelam. On 25 December 2009, passengers and crew subdued a man who attempted to detonate explosives in his underwear on an A330-300 operating Northwest Airlines Flight 253.

On 15 July 2014, a Libyan Airlines A330 was severely damaged in the fighting in Libya and sustained bullet holes in the fuselage. On 20 July 2014, two Afriqiyah Airways Airbus A330s were hit by an RPG at Tripoli International Airport. One was completely destroyed in the ensuing fire.

 Engine related
Several in-flight shutdowns of Trent 700–powered A330-300s have occurred. On 11 November 1996, engine failure on a Cathay Pacific flight forced it back to Ho Chi Minh City. On 17 April 1997, Cathay Pacific's Dragonair subsidiary experienced an engine shutdown on an A330, caused by carbon clogging the oil filter. As a result, Cathay Pacific self-suspended its 120-minute ETOPS clearance. Another engine failure occurred on 6 May during climbout with a Cathay Pacific A330, due to a bearing failure in a Hispano-Suiza-built gearbox. Three days later, a Cathay Pacific A330 on climbout during a Bangkok–Hong Kong flight experienced an oil pressure drop and a resultant engine spool down, forcing a return to Bangkok. The cause was traced to metal contamination in the engine's master chip. Following a fifth engine failure on 23 May, Cathay Pacific and Dragonair voluntarily grounded their A330 fleets for two weeks, causing major disruption as Cathay's eleven A330s made up fifteen per cent of its passenger capacity. Rolls-Royce and Hispano-Suiza developed a redesigned lubrication system to fix the problem.

Other engines have issues too: on 14 July 2015, an Asiana PW4000 was shut down in flight, on 15 January 2017, an Air Europa CF6 was shut down in flight, on 28 December 2017, an Aer Lingus CF6 was shut down in flight, on 18 January 2018, a Malaysia Airlines PW4000 was shut down in flight, on 13 February 2018, a Delta Air Lines PW4000 caught fire, on 29 May 2018, a Delta Air Lines PW4000 had engine vibrations, on 1 June 2018, a Qantas CF6 was shut down in flight, on 1 October 2018, a China Airlines CF6 had an engine problem, and on 5 November 2018, a Brussels Airlines PW4000 was shut down in flight.

Aircraft on display
A former Turkish Airlines A330-300 is preserved at Aircraft Museum Kathmandu in Kathmandu, Nepal. This aircraft was only eight months old when it was written off in a runway excursion at Tribhuvan International Airport. The museum is inside the aircraft, with more than 200 miniature planes inside and aviation artifacts.

Specifications

Aircraft model designations

ICAO Aircraft Type Designators

See also

References
Notes

Citations

Bibliography

Further reading

External links

 
 

 
A330
1990s international airliners
Twinjets
Low-wing aircraft
Aircraft first flown in 1992